A High-Biodiversity Wilderness Area (HBWA) is an elaboration on the IUCN Protected Area classification of a Wilderness Area (Category Ib), which outlines five vast wilderness areas of particularly dense and important levels of biodiversity. The sub-classification was the initiative of Conservation International (CI) in 2003 to identify regions in which at least 70 percent of their original vegetation has remained intact in order to ensure that this is safeguarded and these regions do not become biodiversity hotspots. Currently the areas listed as HBWAs are

 Amazon Basin, Brazil
 Congo Basin, The Democratic Republic of Congo
 New Guinea, Indonesia and Papua New Guinea
 North American Deserts, Southwest United States and Mexico
 Miombo-Mopane Woodlands and Savannas, Zambia

See also

Biodiversity
Conservation biology
Ecoregions
Important Plant Areas
Important Bird Area
International Union for Conservation of Nature
List of types of formally designated forests
Protected areas
Wilderness

References

External links
 A-Z of Areas of Biodiversity Importance: High-Diversity Wilderness AreasConservation International Official Site
 PNAS: Wilderness Biodiversity and Conservation

IUCN Category Ib
Types of formally designated forests
Forest certification